Lu Yang (born 3 March 1991) is a Chinese footballer who currently plays for Chengdu Better City.

Club career
Lu Yang started his professional football career in 2011 when he joined Tianjin Teda for the 2011 Chinese Super League campaign. In March 2012, he transferred to China League Two side Hebei Zhongji. On 29 July 2017, he made his debut for Hebei in the 2017 Chinese Super League against Shanghai Shenhua, coming on as a substitute for Luo Senwen in the 46th minute. He was sent to the Hebei China Fortune reserved team in 2018.

On 27 February 2019, Lu transferred to League Two newcomer Chengdu Better City. He would go on to win promotion with the club as they came runners-up at the end of the 2019 China League Two season. He would be part of the team as the club gained promotion to the top tier at the end of the 2021 league campaign.

Career statistics 
Statistics accurate as of match played 31 December 2021.

References

External links
Player profile at Soccerway.com

1991 births
Living people
Chinese footballers
Footballers from Tianjin
Tianjin Jinmen Tiger F.C. players
Hebei F.C. players
Chengdu Better City F.C. players
Chinese Super League players
China League One players
China League Two players
Association football midfielders